Crematogaster capensis is a species of ant in tribe Crematogastrini. It was described by Mayr in 1862.

References

capensis
Insects described in 1862